Alucita mulciber is a moth of the family Alucitidae. It is found in Costa Rica.

References

Moths described in 1932
Alucitidae
Moths of Central America
Taxa named by Edward Meyrick